The Closet may refer to:

 Coming out of the closet, a figure of speech for lesbian, gay, bisexual, and transgender (LGBT) people's disclosure of their sexual orientation or gender identity
 The Celluloid Closet, a 1981/1987 book by Vito Russo
 Epistemology of the Closet a 1990 book by Eve Kosofsky Sedgwick
 The Corporate Closet, a 1993 book by James D. Woods
 The Celluloid Closet, a 1995 American documentary based on the book of the same name by Vito Russo
 The Closet (2001 film), French film
 The Closet (2007 film), Chinese film
 The Closet (2020 film), South Korean film

See also 
 Closet (disambiguation)
 In the closet (disambiguation)